Population statistics for former Israeli settlements in the Gaza Strip, which were evacuated in 2005 as part of Israel's unilateral disengagement plan.

Israeli settlements in the Gaza Strip

Footnotes
Population Statistic Sources
 * Source: List of Localities: Their Population and Codes, 31.12.1999. Jerusalem: Central Bureau of Statistics, 2000. 
 ** Source: List of Localities: Their Population and Codes, 31.12.2000. Jerusalem: Central Bureau of Statistics, 2001.
 *** Source: Peace Now Settlement Watch for 31.12.2001
 **** After evacuation by the Israeli government, in which all Israeli settlers in Gaza were removed

Settlement Date Sources
 The first date is given by the Settlement Division of the Zionist Organization. 
 The second date is given by the Yesha Council of Jewish Communities in Judea, Samaria and Gaza. 
 Third dates are from Peace Now.

See also
The Israeli settlement page
Gush Katif

External links
Foundation for Middle East Peace
PeaceNow

Former Israeli settlements in the Gaza Strip
Israel geography-related lists
Gaza Strip
Palestine (region)-related lists
Demographic lists